Freedom Plains is a hamlet and census-designated place (CDP) in Dutchess County, New York, United States. As of the 2010 census the population was 421.

Geography
Freedom Plains is in the center of the town of LaGrange, in the south-central part of Dutchess County. New York State Route 55 passes through the hamlet, leading west  to Poughkeepsie, the county seat, and southeast  to Pawling. The Taconic State Parkway forms the eastern edge of Freedom Plains, leading north  to its end at Interstate 90 and south  to New York City. The CDP is bordered to the north by James Baird State Park.

Demographics

References

Geography of Dutchess County, New York
Census-designated places in New York (state)
Hamlets in New York (state)